Samrat Hossain Emily was a Bangladeshi footballer of the  1980s. After starting his career as a striker, he moved to the role of an attacking midfielder in the 2nd half of the decade. 
He is among the few footballers who played with equal success for both the giants MSC and Abahani KC . Between 1983 and 1988-89 he won 6 successive league titles. He also represented the Bangladesh national football team.

Early days
A product of the Pioneer Football League, Emily got his big break while playing for Dhaka League club Wari AC in 1982. He was specially impressive in the Super League and ended the season scoring against Abahani in the final matchday. Thanks to his goals Wari finished fourth in the league, their best finish of the decade.

The tug of war
The beginning of the next season saw both the giants MSC and Abahani engage in a tug of war for his services. At the end he joined the sky blues side from Dhanmondi. Initially there were some concerns about his success at Abahani, as the sky blues already had legendary Kazi Salahuddin as their premier striker. However, Emily proved a great success in his debut season combining superbly with both Salahuddin and left winger Chunnu. In his debut match for Abahani, against Calcutta MSC he scored a superb headed goal.

He won three successive league titles with Abahani between 1983 and 85, but his contribution in the last two seasons suffered due to successive injuries. In September, 1985, he suffered a career threatening injury while playing against the Pakistan Air Force team in AFC qualifying round at Colombo, Sri Lanka. After this incident, abahnai decided to release him.

As a midfielder
After Abahani released him, he joined the rivals MSC in 1986. The first season did not go well for Emily, but he played an important part in winning the league and also won three successive titles for them. So, he won six successive Dhaka league titles. But with the Black and whites he played a different role, the role of no 10.  Emily had to cut short his footballing career as he announced retirement after the 1991-92 season due to the injury he suffered during his time with Abahani.

International career
He played the same role for the Bangladesh (White) team in the President's Gold Cup football tournament in Dhaka in early 1987. The White team was mostly made up of MSC players. The team led by Badal Roy reached the semi-finals before losing to a China team on penalty shoot out. During the tournament Emily found the net once, coming in a 2–2 draw against Thailand, scoring a header from a Badal Roy corner in the 85th minute.

References

External links 
 

Bangladeshi footballers
Bangladesh international footballers
Mohammedan SC (Dhaka) players
Abahani Limited (Dhaka) players
Association football midfielders
Association football forwards